Orquesta Broadway was an American mid-1960s/late 1980s New York-based salsa band. They issued almost 20 albums between 1964 and 1987.

Orquesta Broadway and Típica 73 were two popular New York salsa bands that played in the charanga format.

Some of the famous musicians initially involved were Monguito "El Único", a Cuban nasal-voiced singer (he patterned his vocal style on the Cuban sonero Miguelito Cuní), joined in 1962, when he moved to New York from Mexico, Ronnie Baro, 1992, co-founder of Africando and Roger Dawson, conga drummer (bongos are not typically used in charanga bands).

Their song "El Barrio del Pilar" is considered a type song for the 'marcha' rhythm of the conga drums in salsa.

References

Salsa music groups
Cuban charanga
Musical groups established in 1962
Musical groups from New York City
1962 establishments in New York City